Naked and Afraid is an American reality series that airs on the Discovery Channel. Each episode chronicles the lives of two survivalists who meet for the first time naked and are given the task of surviving a stay in the wilderness for 21 days. Each survivalist is allowed to bring one helpful item, such as a machete or a fire starter. After they meet in the assigned locale, the partners must build a shelter and find water and  food.

The 15th season premiered on February 19, 2023.

Synopsis
The events of each couple's journey play out in a single episode. Partners strip down and meet each other. They are provided with rough cross-body satchels containing a personal diary/camera for use when the camera crew is not there at night, and a map. They all wear identical necklaces with a center bead, which is a microphone with a wire that connects to a wireless audio transmitter hidden in the satchel. Some personal jewelry is allowed. Each survivalist is allowed to bring one helpful item, such as a hatchet or a fire starter. There is a camera crew who are not allowed to intervene except for medical emergencies when it is "absolutely necessary". Castmate Alison Teal reports that she was granted an "emergency" tampon. At the beginning of the fourth season, the survivalists were given a third "surprise" item. A team is allowed to "tap out" at any point during the 21-day challenge. If they do not tap out, they must arrive at the designated extraction point on the final day to be picked up by a helicopter, plane, automobile or boat or other vehicle suitable for the environment. Viewers are updated throughout with statistics, including how many days have passed, the time, and the temperature. Naked and Afraid computes and then updates the cast members' PSR (Primitive Survival Rating), which is based on predictions and observations of survival fitness in skill, experience, and mental strengths. Before and after weight measurements are also revealed at the end of an episode.

Episodes

Production

Locations 
The production's home base is in the United States (the Louisiana Bayou, Florida (Everglades and Seminole County) and Alabama). Panama was used as a setting twice in the first and fifth seasons, Nicaragua was also used twice as well in the third season. Like the first season, the second season visited six countries as well, using Malaysia as a setting once again (Season 1 shot on the Malaysian Borneo, while Season 2's survivalists were stranded in Peninsular Malaysia).  Season 10 took contestants to the frozen tundra of Alaska and an African Kill Zone.

United States

International

Casting call 
On July 31, 2013, Discovery Channel posted a casting call and a dare to "survive the 21-day challenge" via their Twitter account.

Naked After Dark 
Following the success of the live talk show Shark After Dark, Discovery aired Naked After Dark in season two, which aired after each new episode. Host Josh Wolf talked with the cast from the episode, showed behind-the-scenes and never before seen episode footage and has in-studio stunts. It aired for 1 season with 6 episodes.

Pop-Up Editions 
Starting in June 2014, Discovery started airing repeat episodes of the show with "Pop-Up" text on the screen. These graphics shed light on the countries and the survivalists with interesting and often humorous factoids. These shows premiere on Wednesday nights.

Reception

Critical reception 
By the time of the 2015 season premiere, Brian Moylan of The Guardian called it the "best reality show on television" as it "takes the outrageousness of other reality genres, but applies it to celebrate human strength and fortitude rather than exploiting the frailty and narcissism of those that just want to be noticed."

Reviewing the premiere in 2013, Brian Lowry of Variety found Naked and Afraid to be "typical of the genre, but it's still kind of a risible kick, if only for how seriously the show takes itself." Melissa Camacho of Common Sense Media, and David Hinckley of the New York Daily News, gave the show 3 out of 5 stars.

Mike Hale of The New York Times expressed skepticism that the dangers implied by the situations faced by the couples in each episode were authentic, even by the standards of reality television, observing that the couple in the series premiere appeared to be cleaner and more shaven than he would have expected. Hale also was not impressed with the interaction between the two participants, whose personalities he found uninteresting, stating that he found the snake bite suffered by the field producer shown in the beginning of the episode to be more riveting.

Ratings 
Discovery Channel issued a press release which announced some Nielsen ratings milestones for the series. Naked And Afraid was the "#1 Ad-Supported program in cable among men on Sunday, July 28." They also noted that the program now shares the Discovery Channel record for the highest-rated survival telecast in the network's history since June 2009. The "Surthrive" episode in season 4, featuring Bo Stuart and Debbie Harris, is the highest rated episode in the history of the show.

Controversy 
There has been controversy related to how real the show is.  Former contestants have said that the locations are not as isolated as portrayed. A contestant was treated with IV fluids so she could continue, but this was not shown. Les Stroud, of the survival show Survivorman, has been very vocal with his criticism.

See also 
 List of Naked and Afraid episodes
 Naked and Afraid XL
 Marooned with Ed Stafford
 Ed Stafford: Into The Unknown
 Walking the Amazon
 Robinsonade

International versions

References

External links 
 
 
 Naked and Afraid on TV.com
 Llewellyn Toulmin of The Montgomery Sentinel, "Vegetarian survivalist Dani Beau beats the odds in the Colombian jungle," (interview), at http://www.themosttraveled.com/new_land.html

2010s American reality television series
2013 American television series debuts
Adventure reality television series
American adventure television series
Discovery Channel original programming
English-language television shows
Works about survival skills
Television shows set in Africa
Television shows set in Asia
Television shows set in Europe
Television shows set in North America
Television shows set in Oceania
Television shows set in South America
Nudity in television